Georg Comploi (born 9 November 1968) is an Italian ice hockey player. He competed in the men's tournament at the 1992 Winter Olympics.

References

1968 births
Living people
Italian ice hockey players
Olympic ice hockey players of Italy
Ice hockey players at the 1992 Winter Olympics
Sportspeople from Brixen